This is a list of electoral results for the Division of St George in Australian federal elections from the division's creation in 1949 until its abolition in 1993.

Members

Election results

Elections in the 1990s

1990

Elections in the 1980s

1987

1984

1983

1980

Elections in the 1970s

1977

1975

1974

1972

Elections in the 1960s

1969

1966

1963

1961

Elections in the 1950s

1958

1955

1954

1951

Elections in the 1940s

1949

References

 Australian Electoral Commission. Federal election results

Australian federal electoral results by division
Constituencies disestablished in 1949
Constituencies disestablished in 1993
1949 establishments in Australia
1993 disestablishments in Australia